Mohamed Hassanein (born 1913, date of death unknown) was an Egyptian swimmer. He competed in the men's 200 metre breaststroke at the 1936 Summer Olympics.

References

External links
 

1913 births
Year of death missing
Place of birth missing
Egyptian male swimmers
Olympic swimmers of Egypt
Swimmers at the 1936 Summer Olympics